Estonian Association of Journalists (abbreviated EAL) is an Estonian association which unites professional journalist and media workers in Estonia. EAL aims "to uphold, develop and value Estonian journalistic culture and advance the creative possibilities of its members".

EAL is full member in International Federation of Journalists and European Federation of Journalists. EAL is also member in Estonian Cultural Chamber and Estonian Trade Union Confederation.

EAL is established in 1919.

References

External links

Journalism in Estonia
Non-profit organizations based in Estonia